DuArt Film & Video is an American film and recording studio founded in New York City by Al Young in 1922. DuArt has been involved with a number of films over its history, such as Dirty Dancing, The Cider House Rules and Forrest Gump, pioneering in a number of filmmaking technologies. Founder Al Young built one of the earliest continuous 35-millimeter processing machines in 1927, DuArt processed the first film in Eastmancolor negative in 1950, and DuArt also worked with CBS on EVR consumer video-player-based special-motion film in 1966. In 1979, DuArt was presented with an Academy Award for Technical Achievement for their development of the Frame-Count cueing system. During the 1980s, the lab became an industry leader in Super-16mm blow-ups, enabling independent filmmakers the opportunity to compete in the theatrical marketplace with low-budgeted films. In 2000, owner and Chairman Irwin Young was awarded the Gordon E. Sawyer Award by the Academy of Motion Picture Arts and Sciences for technological contributions to the motion picture industry.

In 2013, as DuArt began closing their film storage facilities, a number of film archives—including the Academy Film Archive, the Library of Congress, the Museum of Modern Art, the UCLA Film & Television Archive, the George Eastman House, the Harvard Film Archive, and Anthology Film Archives—collaborated to find homes for thousands of orphaned films stored at DuArt, including elements for independent features, documentaries, student films, industrials, shorts, animation, and foreign films.  The DuArt Collection at the Academy Film Archive is now home to over five hundred of these films.

On August 25, 2021, DuArt announced that they would be ceasing all of its media services to focus on its real estate holding.

The studio recently opened its doors for anime dubbing, original animation, and commercials, with clients including Viacom, AnimeWho, The Pokémon Company International, 4Kids Entertainment, Accel Animation, J. Kyle's Korner Entertainment and Mondo Media. Their notable works include Pokémon (Season 11–22), Joe vs. Joe, and It's All Elementary (an upcoming claymation television series created by J. Kyle Manzay).

Production List

Anime 
 Ikki Tousen (Seasons 3–4)
 Pokémon (Seasons 11–22)
 Pokémon: The Rise of Darkrai
 Pokémon: Giratina and the Sky Warrior
 Pokémon: Arceus and the Jewel of Life
 Pokémon: Zoroark: Master of Illusions
 Pokémon the Movie: Black—Victini and Reshiram and White—Victini and Zekrom
 Pokémon the Movie: Kyurem vs. the Sword of Justice
 Pokémon the Movie: Genesect and the Legend Awakened
 Pokémon the Movie: Diancie and the Cocoon of Destruction
 Pokémon the Movie: Hoopa and the Clash of Ages
 Pokémon the Movie: Volcanion and the Mechanical Marvel
 Pokémon the Movie: I Choose You!
 Pokémon the Movie: The Power of Us
 Pokémon: Mewtwo Strikes Back—Evolution
 Joe vs Joe

Animation Titles 
 Alisa Knows What to Do!
 Be Be Bears - Bjorn and Bucky
 It's All Elementary
 South India Fables
 Three Musketeers
 The Dragon Spell
 Regal Academy
 Raju the Rickshaw
 Robocar Poli
 Shaktimaan: The Animation
 Shockdeva
 The Snow Queen 3: Fire and Ice
 Hardboiled
 Winx Club (Season 7)
 World of Winx

Video Games 
 PokéPark Wii: Pikachu's Adventure
 PokéPark 2: Wonders Beyond
 Bullet Witch: Renegade

References

Notes

External links 
 

1922 establishments in New York City
Academy Award for Technical Achievement winners
Companies based in New York City
Dubbing studios
Mass media companies established in 1922
Recording studios in Manhattan